Wangaratta Airport  is located about  south of Wangaratta, Victoria, Australia just off the Hume Highway. It provides for general aviation, maintenance, an aero club, emergency services and occasional RAAF flights.

See also
 List of airports in Victoria

References

External links
Precision Aerospace / Pacific Fighters Museum
Airports Worldwide
Secure Air Flight Training

Airports in Victoria (Australia)